Georg may refer to:

 Georg (film), 1997
Georg (musical), Estonian musical
 Georg (given name)	
 Georg (surname)
 , a Kriegsmarine coastal tanker

See also
 George (disambiguation)